Flammeovirga kamogawensis is a bacterium from the genus of Flammeovirga which has been isolated from coastal seawater from Kamogawa in Japan.

References

External links
Type strain of Flammeovirga kamogawensis at BacDive -  the Bacterial Diversity Metadatabase	

Cytophagia
Bacteria described in 2007